Benjamin P. Sachs is a physician with health care management experience at the Harvard Medical School hospitals and the Tulane University Medical Center.

Early life and education
Sachs was born in London, the son of Holocaust survivors.  He graduated from St. Mary's Hospital Medical School in London. He received a degree in Public Health from the University of Toronto and completed a residency in obstetrics and gynecology and a fellowship in Maternal-Fetal Medicine at the Brigham & Women's Hospital in Boston.

In 1980, Sachs was a visiting scientist at the Centers for Disease Control in Atlanta. In 1987 he completed the Program for Management Development at the Harvard Business School.

Sach's background is in clinical medicine, public health - health policy and finance - business administration with extensive executive experience in physician and hospital management.

Career

Harvard Medical School
In 1978, Sachs started work at the Harvard Medical School.  He would eventually serve as chairman of the OB/GYN Department at Beth Israel Deaconess Medical Center (BIDMC) and the Harvard Medical School.  Sachs was also appointed as the Harold H. Rosenfield Professor at Harvard Medical School and the Harvard School of Public Health (1997-2007)

Sachs and Major Peter Nielsen, MD, led a team to transfer the concept of crew resource management to obstetrical care. Funded by the U.S. Department of Defense and the Harvard Risk Management Foundation, this was the first major research effort to evaluate team training in healthcare. This crew resource management program formed the basis for TeamSTEPPS, the Agency for Healthcare Research and Quality's national program.  TeamSTEPPS is used in hospital Ob/Gyn, surgical, emergency medicine and ICU care departments.

Sachs helped create a research team led by Dr. Ananth Karumanchi that discovered the probable cause of preeclampsia. The team's research was published in the Journal of the American Medical Association, the New England Journal of Medicine, the Journal of Clinical Investigation, Nature Medicine, and was described in The New Yorker.

Sachs was also served as president of the Beth Israel-Deaconess Physician Organization.

Tulane Medical School
Sachs joined Tulane Medical School in November 2007.  The university had suffered $900 million in damage from Hurricane Katrina and lost a third of the medical school faculty. [7] Sachs' objectives were to help Tulane recover and to fundamentally redesign the medical school and the New Orleans healthcare system. Sachs created a network of 68 clinics in the New Orleans area that by 2010 was treating approximately 200,000 people per year.

During Sachs' tenure, Tulane Medical School hired more leaders and increased the entrance exam scores of its students.  It received the 2010 Association of American Medical Colleges Spencer Foreman Award for outstanding community service.

Sachs served at Tulane for six years as Senior Vice President, dean of the Medical School and the James R. Doty Distinguished Professor and Chair.  Sachs retired from Tulane in 2014.

Current
In June 2014, Sachs was appointed the interim dean of the new School of Medicine being developed by the University of the Virgin Islands in St. Croix. Sachs is helping UVISOM become the first English-speaking medical school Caribbean region that is Liaison Committee on Medical Education (LCME) accredited.

Honors
 Combined Jewish Philanthropies Boston: Circle of Excellence Award (1999) 
 Combined Jewish Philanthropies Boston: Lewis Millender Community of Excellence Award (2000) 
 Blue Cross Blue Shield Healthcare Excellence Award (2007) 
 The Jewish Federation of New Greater New Orleans Executive committee of board (2008-) 
 AAMC Spencer Foreman Award – Tulane School of Medicine (2010) 
 AAMC Council of Deans Administrative Board (2011-2014) 
 New Orleans Council for Community and Justice: Weiss Awards (2011) 
 AAMC Board of Directors (2012-) 
 Louisiana Cancer Research Center – board chair: Funded by the state, a new 32,000sq of laboratory building opened in 2012, funded by the state.  
 New Orleans Bio- Innovation Center – board chair: A technology business incubator, funded by the state that aims to stimulate bioscience entrepreneurship in the New Orleans area.
 The Joint Commission Eisenberg national award for patient safety innovation (2007)

Selected works
 Sachs BP, Korf B.  The Human Genome Project:  Implications for the practicing obstetrician.  Obstet And Gynecol 1993; 81(3):458-462.
 Sachs BP, Fretts RC, Gardner R, Hellerstein S, Wampler N, Wise PH.  The impact of extreme prematurity and congenital anomalies on the interpretation of international comparisons of infant mortality.  Obstet and Gynecol  1995; 85:941-946.
 Ricciotti HA, Chen KT, Sachs BP. The role of obstetrical medical technology in preventing low birth weight. Future Child. 1995 spring; 5(1):71-86.  
 Kempe A, Sachs BP, Ricciotti H, Sobol AM, Wise PH.  Public health implications of home uterine activity monitoring.  Public Health Rep. 1997 Sep-Oct;112(5):433-9
 Sachs BP, Kobelin C, Castro MA, Frigoletto F. Lowering the cesarean delivery rate-weighing the risks.    N. Engl J Med  1999;340(1):54-57 
 Fretts RC, Rodman G, Gomez-Carrion Y, Goldberg R, Sachs BP, Myers E, Kessel. Preventive health services received by minority women aged 45–64 and the goals of healthy people 2000. Women's Health Issues. 2000 Nov-Dec; 10(6):305-11.
 Sachs BP. Vaginal birth after cesarean: a health policy perspective. Clin Obstet Gynecol.  2001 Sep;44(3):553-60.
 Levine RJ, Maynard SE, Qian C, Lim KH, England LJ, Yu KF, Schisterman EF, Thadhani R, Sachs BP, Epstein FH, Sibai BM, Sukhatme VP, Karumanchi SA. Circulating Angiogenic Factors and the Risk of Preeclampsia. NEJM 2004; 350:672-83
 Levine RJ, Thadhani R, Qian C, Lam C, Lim KH, Yu KF, Blink AL, Sachs BP, Epstein FH, Sibai BM,     Sukhatme VP, Karumanchi SA.   Urinary placental growth factor and risk of preeclampsia. JAMA. 2005 Jan 5;293(1):77-85.
 Sachs BP, A 38-Year-Old woman with fetal loss and hysterectomy. JAMA 2005 Aug 17:294(7): 833-40
 Bdolah Y, Karumanchi SA, Sachs BP. Recent advances in understanding of preeclampsia Croat Med J. Oct; 46(5):728-36.Review.
 Coleman VH, Erickson K, Schulkin J, Zinberg S, Sachs BP, Vaginal birth after cesarean delivery; practice patterns of obstetricians-gynecologists. Obstet Gynecol Surv. 2005 Oct;60(10):636-7
 Bdolah Y, Palomaki GE, Yaron Y, Bdolah-Abram T, Golaman, M, Levin RJ, Sachs BP, Haddow JE, Karumanchi, SA. Circulating angiogenic proteins trisomy 12 Am J Obstet Gynecol. 2006 Jan:194(1):239-45
 Sachs BP, A Woman with Fetal Loss – Reply. JAMA 2006 Jan 25:295(4):386-87
 Mann S, Sachs BP, Lessons from the cockpit: Using teamwork to improve patient safety. Contemp Ob Gyn. 2006 Jan:51(1)34-45
 Pratt SD, Sachs BP. Team training: classroom training vs. high-fidelity simulation [Perspective]. AHRQ WebM&M [serial online]. March 2006. Available at: https://web.archive.org/web/20130217202638/http://webmm.ahrq.gov/perspective.aspx?perspectiveID=21.
 Mann S, Pratt S, Gluck P, Nielsen P, Risser D, Greenberg P, Marcus R, Goldman M, Shapiro, D, Pearlman M, Sachs B, Assessing quality in obstetrical care: development of standardized measures (JCAHO) J Qual 2006. Sep;32(9)497-505
 Levine RJ, Lam C, Qian C, Yu K, Maynard SE, Sachs BP, Sibai B, Epstein FH, Romero R, Thadhani R, Karumanchi SA, Soluble endoglin, a novel circulating anti-angiogenic factor in preeclampsia.  N Engl J Med 2006;355:992-1005
 Nielsen P, Goldman M, Mann S, Shapiro D, Marcus R, Pratt S, Greenberg P, McNamee P, Salisbury M, Birnbach D, Gluck P, Pearlman M, King H, Tornberg D, Sachs B, The labor and delivery teamwork intervention trial. Obstetrics and Gynecology 2007 109 (1)
 Sachs BP, Krane NK, Kahn MJ:  Medical school dean as a turnaround agent. American Journal of the Medical Sciences, 336:181-184, 2008

References 

Year of birth missing (living people)
Living people
Alumni of St Mary's Hospital Medical School
Harvard Business School alumni
Medical doctors from London
University of Toronto alumni